Teodora Męczkowska, née Oppman (5 September 1870 – 11 December 1954), was a Polish feminist, suffragette and educator.

Life
Teodora Maria Męczkowska was born in Łowicz, Congress Poland, on 5 September 1870. She graduated from high school in 1888 and moved to Switzerland two years later. She earned a B.A. in the natural sciences from the University of Geneva in 1896 and married the physician and independence activist Wacław Męczkowski a year before graduating. They settled in Warsaw, Vistula Land, as Congress Poland became known under Russian efforts to consolidate control, and agreed to have no children. She taught in a girls' school in Warsaw before the start of World War I in 1914 and was a member of the Warsaw Pedagogical Society from 1903. Męczkowska became Poland's first female schools inspector after it became independent in 1918; she held the position until she retired in 1934. During World War II, she covertly taught classes during the German occupation of Poland and fled to Zakopane, Poland, after the defeat of the Warsaw Uprising in 1944. She returned to Warsaw after the end of the war and taught high-school biology until her death on 11 December 1954.

Activities
Męczkowska was briefly a member of the Union for the Equal Rights of Polish Women in 1907, but found it too radical for her taste and started the more moderate Polish Women's Rights Association. She attended all four of the women's congresses held in Poland (1905, 1907, 1917, and 1938) and was President of the Central Committee of Polish Women's Rights in newly independent Poland.

Notes

References

1870 births
1954 deaths
People from Łowicz
People from Warsaw Governorate
Polish feminists
Schoolteachers from Warsaw
Polish women's rights activists
Polish expatriates in Switzerland
University of Geneva alumni